This is a list of episodes for the Medabots anime series and its sequel, Medarot Damashii  (Unofficially known in English as Medabots Spirits), which are based on the video game franchise of the same name. Overall, the television series was broadcast in Japan on TV Tokyo from July 2, 1999 to March 30, 2001. The original fifty-two episode series was animated by Bee Train and was broadcast from July 2, 1999 to June 30, 2000. Damashii was animated by Production I.G and ran for thirty-nine episodes broadcast from July 7, 2000 to March 30, 2001. 

Both series were originally licensed and localized into English by Nelvana; the first series was divided into two seasons for its U.S. broadcast and the episodes aired in a different order. The first U.S. season, consisting of 26 episodes, originally aired on the Fox Broadcasting Company's Fox Kids block from September 1, 2001 to April 27, 2002. Future episodes would premiere on ABC Family, which had already been airing reruns since March 4, 2002. The second U.S. season originally aired on ABC Family from July 1 to November 2, 2002, while Damashii first aired on the network from September 13, 2003 to May 8, 2004. Later episodes and reruns were aired as part of the Jetix block and Toon Disney's Jetix in November 2004.

The Japanese version has received a VHS and DVD release for the first series, while Damashii has only received a VHS release. On January 29, 2010, a Region 2 boxset release known as MEDAROT DVD BOX 1 was released containing the first thirty episodes, with a second boxset on February 19 finishing with the last twenty-two episodes. Two boxsets for Medarot Damashii were released on December 30, 2010. This was Damashii's first DVD release.

From 2002 to 2003, ADV Films released twelve volumes of both the first and second seasons. In 2007, Shout! Factory released the first season of the English version on Region 1 DVD. There were plans to release the second season on DVD, but was canceled. Both series are currently licensed by Discotek Media.

Episode list

Medabots

Episodes 1-39

Episodes 40-52

Medarot Damashii / Medabots Spirits

Home video releases

DVD Region 1 (North America)
The following was released as Nelvana held the license, all dub only in its order. Medabots was first released in North America by ADV Films as 12 separate volumes from 2002 to 2003 covering the first two seasons. The first three volumes were later re-released in 2005 under ADV Kidz via their Essential Anime Collection. Later, Shout! Factory released a 4-disc DVD box set in 2008 covering the first season.

Blu-ray Region A (North America)
The license was transferred to Discotek Media, a company known for rescuing other anime from other distributors. All of the following are SD Blu-rays that are meant to play the show in Standard Definition on a Blu-ray Disc, albeit the decreased amount of discs meaning convenience for collectors, thus it would be lower in price than the DVD release. They released all three seasons of the dub version (in the order Nelvana presented) from 2019 to 2021 with optional English SDH subtitles, and then release the sub version (in its order) later in the future.

On June 11, 2020, Justin Sevakis said Discotek Media were unable to find the masters for the English version of Medabots Spirits which has prevented the anime from being released on home video in North America. Discotek Media has asked fans to help find the masters, and on September 14, 2020, they have found suitable masters, meaning Medabots Spirits would get its first-ever North American physical release on May 25, 2021.

References

Lists of anime episodes